Max Thomas can refer to:

 Max Thomas (bishop) (1926-2008), Australian bishop
 Max Thomas (cricketer) (1921-2001), Australian cricketer
 Max Thomas (footballer, born 1930) (born 1930), former Australian rules footballer for Carlton from 1952 to 1954
 Max Thomas (footballer, born 1945) (born 1945), former Australian rules footballer for Carlton in 1966
 Max Thomas (gymnast) (1874-1929), American Olympic gymnast